Joseph Hutmacker (born 1892, date of death unknown) was a Belgian wrestler. He competed in the freestyle light heavyweight event at the 1924 Summer Olympics.

References

1892 births
Year of death missing
Olympic wrestlers of Belgium
Wrestlers at the 1924 Summer Olympics
Belgian male sport wrestlers
Place of birth missing
20th-century Belgian people